Robert Wickliffe may refer to:

Robert C. Wickliffe (1819–1895), 15th Governor of Louisiana, 1856–1860
Robert Charles Wickliffe (1874–1912), his son, U.S. Representative for Louisiana, 1909–1912

See also
Robert Wickliffe Woolley (1871–1958), American Democratic politician from Washington D.C.